Rani Rampal (born 4 December 1994, born in Haryana) is an Indian field hockey player. At the age of 15, she was the youngest player in the national team which participated in the 2010 World Cup. She has completed her schooling but was not able to get the graduate degree due to practice sessions and matches which were lined up. She plays forward on her team. She has played 212 international matches and scored 134 goals. She is currently the Captain for Indian Women's Hockey Team. She is also well known as a striker who often doubles up as mid-fielder. She has a great fascination with CWG. In 2020, the Government of India honoured her with the Padma Shri.

Early life
Rani was born on 4 December 1994 in Shahabad Markanda in the Kurukshetra district of Haryana. Her father works as a cart-puller. She was registered in the town's team by the age of 6. Initially her abilities were questioned but later on she demonstrated her potential to her coach. She took to field hockey in 2003 and trained at the Shahabad Hockey Academy under Baldev Singh, a recipient of Dronacharya Award. She first came to Junior Nationals in Gwalior and at Chandigarh School Nationals and she was later admitted into national squad. She made her Senior year debut when she was only 14 years, which made her the youngest player in the Indian Women's Hockey team. As she started to play professionally, GoSports Foundation, a sports non-governmental organization provided her with monetary and non-monetary support as her family found it hard to support her dreams financially. She was part of Indian Hockey Team when the team qualified for  2016 Rio Olympics after 36 years. Under her Captaincy India reached in the semifinal in 2020 Tokyo Olympics first time in the history of India after inclusion of Women's hockey in olympics.

Career
Rani played in the Champion's Challenge Tournament held in Kazan, Russia in June 2009 and powered India to a win by scoring 4 goals in the finals. She was adjudged "The Top Goal Scorer" and the "Young Player of the Tournament."

She was instrumental in winning the silver medal for the Indian team in the Asia Cup held in Nov 2009. After playing with India's national team at 2010 Commonwealth Games and 2010 Asian Games, Rani Rampal was nominated in FIH Women's All-Star Team of 2010. She was nominated for ' young woman player of the year' award. She was also included the All-Star team of the Asian Hockey Federation based on her performance in  2010 Asian Games at Guangzhou.

At the 2010 Women’s Hockey World Cup held in Rosario, Argentina, she scored a total of seven goals which placed India in the ninth position in World Women's hockey rankings. This is India's best performance since 1978. She is the only Indian to be nominated for the FIH Women's Young Player of the Year Award, 2010. She was conferred the "Best Young Player of the Tournament" award at the Women's Hockey World Cup 2010, recognizing her stellar performance as the top field goal scorer in the tournament. She was awarded with the Arjuna award in 2016 which was like one of her dreams come true.

She was also adjudged the 'Player of the Tournament' at the 2013 Junior World Cup which India finished with a bronze medal. She has been named for FICCI Comeback of the Year Award 2014. In 2013 Junior World Cup she made India won its first ever bronze medal at the event.

She was part of 2017 Women's Asian Cup, and they also won the title second time in 2017 at Kakamigahara in Japan, for the first time the trophy was brought in year 2004, due to this they got selected for world cup which was held in 2018.

She led the Indian women's hockey team as captain in 2018 Asian Games, where they won a silver medal and was India's flag-bearer for the closing ceremony of the games.

She worked as Assistant Coach with Sports Authority Of India.

Awards
Major Dhyan Chand Khel Ratna (2020) - Highest Sporting Honour of India.
Padma Shri (2020) - fourth Highest Indian National Honour

References

External links

Rani Rampal at Hockey India

1994 births
Living people
Indian female field hockey players
21st-century Indian women
21st-century Indian people
Asian Games medalists in field hockey
Asian Games silver medalists for India
Asian Games bronze medalists for India
Female field hockey forwards
Field hockey players at the 2010 Asian Games
Field hockey players at the 2014 Asian Games
Field hockey players at the 2010 Commonwealth Games
Field hockey players at the 2014 Commonwealth Games
Field hockey players at the 2016 Summer Olympics
Field hockey players at the 2020 Summer Olympics
Field hockey players at the 2018 Asian Games
Field hockey players from Haryana
Medalists at the 2014 Asian Games
Medalists at the 2018 Asian Games
Olympic field hockey players of India
Sportswomen from Haryana
Recipients of the Padma Shri in sports
Recipients of the Khel Ratna Award
Commonwealth Games competitors for India
South Asian Games gold medalists for India
South Asian Games medalists in field hockey